Patrick McGuire (1889 – 12 October 1916) was an English professional footballer who played in the Football League for Manchester City as a full-back.

Personal life 
McGuire attended Corpus Christi School, Miles Platting and Woodhouses School, Failsworth. He was a bricklayer by trade. In May 1915, almost one year into the First World War, McGuire enlisted as a private in the Manchester Regiment. McGuire was killed while attacking a German trench system near Flers, France on 12 October 1916, during the Battle of the Somme. He is commemorated on the Thiepval Memorial.

Career statistics

References

1889 births
1916 deaths
Footballers from Manchester
English footballers
English Football League players
Association football fullbacks
British Army personnel of World War I
Manchester Regiment soldiers
British military personnel killed in the Battle of the Somme
Ashton United F.C. players
Manchester United F.C. players
Military personnel from Manchester
Manchester City F.C. players
Grimsby Town F.C. wartime guest players
British bricklayers